XY Notrump (also known as Two Way Checkback and Two Way New-Minor-Forcing) is a bidding convention in contract bridge.

Using the convention 
After opener's one of a suit (X), partner's one of a suit response (Y) and opener's 1NT rebid (a very common sequence), 2 from opener's partner forces 2 from opener. Holding a weak hand with diamonds, one can now pass. Other bids are invitational, describing also the nature of the hand. A 2 response to 1NT, however, is game forcing with any hand. Responder may also jump to 3 of any suit (except 3, which is signoff) to show a slam-invitational hand with good suit(s).

Examples 
For example, on the sequence 1-1 (with or without opponent's interfering);1NT-2;2,2 will show an invitational hand with minimum five spades and four hearts, 2 an invitational hand with minimum five spades (in which case one does not have four hearts) or possibly six spades with or without four hearts. 2NT will show a balanced invitational hand, 3 typically an unbalanced invitational hand with club support. However, when one instead forces game with 2, opener will immediately start describing his own hand. He may, on basis of the aforementioned auction, with 2 being the only difference, bid 2 holding four hearts, 2 holding three card spade support, etc. Further bids are primarily natural.

Advantages 
XY Notrump gives very good control finding both games and slams, as the final "mission" of the sequence is established at a relatively early stage of bidding.

Playing, as very common in combination with XY no trump, the Walsh convention or even Transfer Walsh, one still has the chance of stopping in 2 on weak hands, often impossible using for example Checkback Stayman.

Variations 
A popular expanded version of XY Notrump is the so-called "XYZ" , meaning the principles of regular XY Notrump is valid even after one of a suit (X) - one of a suit (Y); one of a suit (or notrump) (Z) auction. It replaces such a method as Fourth suit forcing.

See also 
 Walsh convention
 XYZ convention
 Transfer Walsh
 New minor forcing
 Checkback Stayman

Notes 
 A publication on the XYZ variation of the XY Notrump convention
 A system publication based on Baard Olav Aasan methods, concerning particularly Transfer Walsh and XY no trump (in Norwegian)

Bridge conventions